One Night Stand is an HBO stand-up series that first aired on February 15, 1989. The half-hour series aired weekly and featured stand-up comedy specials from some of the top performing comedians. The series originally comprised 55 specials over the course of its four years on HBO. Comedians who performed on One Night Stand include Bill Hicks, Bill Maher, Colin Quinn, Dom Irrera, Gilbert Gottfried, Norm Macdonald, Eddie Griffin, Martin Lawrence, D.L. Hughley, Damon Wayans, Larry Miller, Ellen DeGeneres, Charles Fleischer, and George Wallace. This first-run of the series ended in 1992, with repeats edited for language and time continuing for years over Comedy Central, a former associate network to HBO.

One Night Stand returned on August 19, 2005. The series aired each Friday at midnight through October 21, 2005, showing a total of ten half-hour stand-up specials. Some of the comedians included are Louis C.K, Jim Norton, Patrice O'Neal, Bill Burr, Bonnie McFarlane, Kevin Brennan, Omid Djalili, Flight of the Conchords, and more. The 2005 version was directed by Linda Mendoza.

External links
 

HBO original programming
1980s American comedy television series
1990s American stand-up comedy television series
1989 American television series debuts
1992 American television series endings
2000s American stand-up comedy television series
2005 American television series debuts
2005 American television series endings
English-language television shows
HBO Shows (series) WITHOUT Episode info, list, or Article